Gymnophalloides heardi is a parasitic fluke that infects the marsh rice rat Oryzomys palustris and the clapper rail Rallus crepitans. Its second intermediate host is the snail Melampus bidentatus (in genus Melampus). It is smaller than the two other species of Gymnophalloides, G. seoi and G. tokiensis.

References

Literature cited
Ching, H. L. 1995. Four new gymnophallid digeneans from rice rats, willets, and molluscs in Florida. Journal of Parasitology 81(6):924–928.

Parasites of rodents
Parasites of birds
Animals described in 1995
Plagiorchiida